Pseudanthenea grayi  is a species of sea stars in the family Orestieridae. It is the sole species in the genus Pseudanthenea.

References

Oreasteridae
Monotypic echinoderm genera
Asteroidea genera
Taxa named by Ludwig Heinrich Philipp Döderlein